Timothy Todd Wallace (born August 6, 1984) is an American professional ice hockey center and ice hockey coach. He is currently signed to National Ice Hockey League (NIHL) side Milton Keynes Lightning as Player/Coach and Director of Hockey Development.

Between May 2019 and January 2022, Wallace was head coach of UK EIHL side Nottingham Panthers. Wallace also previously served as joint Player/Coach between 2018–19 for fellow English club Milton Keynes Lightning, alongside Ryan Lannon.

Before starting his professional career, Wallace played four seasons with the University of Notre Dame of the CCHA. A product of the U.S. National Team Developmental Program, he was a member of gold-medal teams at both the 2002 Under-18 World Championships and the Under-17 World Challenge in 2001.

Playing career
As a youth, Wallace played in the 1998 Quebec International Pee-Wee Hockey Tournament with a minor ice hockey team from Alaska.

College
Wallace played four collegiate seasons (2002–2006) at the University of Notre Dame, where he set a school record by playing in all 153 games during his career. He scored 25 goals with 34 assists for 59 points and had 39 penalties for 86 minutes. As a senior, he notched 11 goals and 12 assists for 23 points to finish fifth on the team in scoring.

Professional

An undrafted free agent, Wallace was signed to a contract after attending a tryout camp with Pittsburgh in the fall of 2006. In his first season, he split time between the ECHL's Wheeling Nailers and the AHL's Wilkes-Barre/Scranton Penguins, seeing action in 51 games with 11 goals and 20 assists for 31 points and 62 penalty minutes. He played in 11 playoff games for Wilkes-Barre/Scranton, scoring a goal and an assist. In 2007-08, Wallace played in 74 games with Wilkes-Barre/Scranton, accruing 12 goals and 14 assists for 26 points and 83 minutes in penalties. He played in 22 postseason games in helping the Baby Penguins advance to the Calder Cup finals against Chicago. He had two goals and six assists for eight points and 21 penalty minutes in the playoffs.

Wallace made his NHL debut on December 10, 2008, against the New Jersey Devils. He registered his first NHL point, an assist, on December 18, 2008 vs. the Atlanta Thrashers.

On February 23, 2012 Wallace was claimed off waivers by Tampa Bay Lightning from the New York Islanders after playing 31 games in the NHL season.

After seven professional seasons within North America, Wallace left as a free agent and signed a one-year contract with Örebro HK of the Swedish Hockey League on August 6, 2013. In his debut season in Sweden, Wallace adapted quickly in Örebro, posting 15 goals and 32 points in 55 games to earn a one-year contract extension on April 3, 2014. In the midst of the 2014–15 season, having been unable to replicate his previous seasons form with Örebro, Wallace was loaned to fellow SHL outfit Brynäs IF on December 10, 2014.

On September 7, 2015, having left Sweden after two-years as a free agent, Wallace agreed to a one-year contract with German club, Grizzlys Wolfsburg of the Deutsche Eishockey Liga.

As a free agent after three seasons abroad, Wallace opted to return to his hometown in Anchorage, and agreed to play in third tier ECHL, signing a standard contract with the Alaska Aces on October 13, 2016.

On May 25, 2017, Wallace again left North America and moved to the UK to sign a one-year deal with the Sheffield Steelers of the EIHL.

After a season in Sheffield, Wallace moved to league rivals Milton Keynes Lightning in 2018. Wallace and teammate Ryan Lannon subsequently replaced Doug McKay as Lightning head coach early into the 2018–19 EIHL season. He later re-signed as a Milton Keynes Lightning player in January 2022 following his departure from Nottingham, and will combine his playing role with the title of Director of Hockey Development.

He re-signed as a Milton Keynes player for the 2022–23 season, where he will serve as the club's Player/Coach following the departure of Lewis Clifford.

Coaching career
After a spell as Player/Coach of Milton Keynes Lightning, Wallace was hired in 2019 by Nottingham Panthers director of hockey Guillaume Doucet to be the club's new head coach - replacing Rich Chernomaz. Wallace was relieved of his duties in Nottingham in January 2022.

In May 2022, Wallace replaced Lewis Clifford and returned for a second spell as Player/Coach with Milton Keynes Lightning, combining the role with his title of Director of Hockey Development.

Career statistics

International

References

External links 

1984 births
Alaska Aces (ECHL) players
American men's ice hockey left wingers
Bridgeport Sound Tigers players
Brynäs IF players
Carolina Hurricanes players
Charlotte Checkers (2010–) players
Grizzlys Wolfsburg players
Ice hockey people from Anchorage, Alaska
Living people
New York Islanders players
Notre Dame Fighting Irish men's ice hockey players
Milton Keynes Lightning players
Örebro HK players
Pittsburgh Penguins players
Sheffield Steelers players
Tampa Bay Lightning players
Undrafted National Hockey League players
USA Hockey National Team Development Program players
Wheeling Nailers players
Wilkes-Barre/Scranton Penguins players